Rhaebus gebleri is a species of bean weevil in the tribe Rhaebini. This species was described by Gotthelf Fischer von Waldheim in 1824, and is the type species of the genus Rhaebus.

Distribution 
Rhaebus gebleri is restricted to the Palearctic realm, and is found in South-western Russia, Turkey, Israel, Iran, Kazakhstan, and Mongolia. It is found in semi-desert and steppes, especially near the shores of saline ponds and lakes.

References 

Bruchinae
Beetles of Asia
Beetles of Europe
Beetles described in 1824
Taxa named by Gotthelf Fischer von Waldheim